Format was an agency set up in 1983 to represent women photographers, with the aim of documenting the world from a different perspective. The agency operated for two decades, and its end, in 2003, was marked by an exhibition. In 2010, the National Portrait Gallery, London, showed a range of work by Format photographers.

The idea of an all-women photo agency was the conception of Maggie Murray and Val Wilmer, and Format's membership over the years also included Jackie Chapman, Anita Corbin, Sue Darlow, Melanie Friend, Sheila Gray, Paula Glassman, Judy Harrison, Pam Isherwood, Roshini Kempadoo, Jenny Mathews, Joanne O'Brien, Raissa Page, Brenda Prince, Ulrike Preuss, Mirium Reik, Karen Robinson, Paula Solloway, Mo Wilson and Lisa Woollett.

References

Arts organizations established in 1983
2003 disestablishments in England
Women's organisations based in the United Kingdom
Women photographers
British photography organisations
Photo agencies